José Enrique Azócar (born May 11, 1996) is a Venezuelan professional baseball outfielder for the San Diego Padres of Major League Baseball (MLB). He made his MLB debut in 2022.

Career

Detroit Tigers
Azocar signed with the Detroit Tigers as an international free agent in October 2012 and would make his professional debut in 2013 with the VSL Tigers (the Venezuelan Summer League). He would then join the short-season single-a Connecticut Tigers in 2015, before quickly being sent to the GCL Tigers roster, where he was named a 2015 Post Season All-Star. He hit .325 with 29 RBIs and ten doubles to go with five triples. His play warranted a call-up for the 2016 season to the West Michigan Whitecaps, where he spent the entire year. He made another jump in play up to high-A Lakeland for 2017, however despite seeing his first professional home runs (he would hit three), his average would drop from .281 in 2016 to .220 in 2017.

Azocar would spend 2018 in both West Michigan and Lakeland. He would start 2019 with the Erie SeaWolves. As of May 11, 2019, he possessed the third-highest batting average in the Eastern League with a .336 clip. His average would ultimately take a down-tick, but it would be sitting at .293 when, on June 24, he was named to the Eastern League All-Star Game for the Western Division. At time of honoring, he led the league in hits with 136, was tied for third-highest batting average in the league (.284), had 39 multi-hit games, and also had ten home runs and 56 RBIs. He would ultimately earn the dubious distinction of leading the minor leagues in 2019 by grounding into 22 double plays. However, he would be named the Eastern League Rookie of the Year for 2019, becoming the first SeaWolves' player to earn the honor. Azocar was re-signed by the Tigers organization after becoming a minor league free agent on November 7, 2019.

San Diego Padres
On November 18, 2020, Azocar signed a minor league contract with the San Diego Padres. On April 7, 2022, Azocar had his contract selected to the major league roster and made his MLB debut that night. On his first turn, he had the first hit and drove in his first run.

References

External links

1996 births
Living people
People from Güiria
Venezuelan expatriate baseball players in the United States
Major League Baseball players from Venezuela
Major League Baseball outfielders
San Diego Padres players
Venezuelan Summer League Tigers players
Connecticut Tigers players
Gulf Coast Tigers players
West Michigan Whitecaps players
Lakeland Flying Tigers players
Erie SeaWolves players
Mesa Solar Sox players
San Antonio Missions players
El Paso Chihuahuas players